Withey is a surname. Notable people with the surname include:

Chester Withey (1887–1939), American actor, film director and screenwriter
Graham Withey (born 1960), English footballer
Jeff Withey (born 1990), American basketball player
Russell Withey (born 1991), Botswana cricketer
Solomon Lewis Withey (1820–1886), American judge

See also
Jim McWithey (1927–2009), American racing driver